Bucculatrix quieta is a moth in the  family Bucculatricidae. It is found in South Africa. It was described in 1913 by Edward Meyrick.

References

Natural History Museum Lepidoptera generic names catalog

Endemic moths of South Africa
Bucculatricidae
Moths described in 1913
Taxa named by Edward Meyrick
Moths of Africa